Rempang is an island, located 2.5 km South-East of Batam,
165.83 km2. belonging to a group of three islands called Barelang (an abbreviation of Batam-Rempang-Galang)  A member of the Riau Archipelago, in the Riau Islands province of Indonesia, Rempang is located just south of Batam and north of Galang which themselves are just south of Singapore and Johor. The nearest city to Rempang is Tanjung Pinang on Bintan, situated about half hour boat ride from Batam.

The island is connected by the Barelang Bridge to Galang and Batam.

References 

Riau Archipelago
Uninhabited islands of Indonesia